On 9 February 1947, elections were held for the Supreme Soviets of the Soviet Union's constituent republics.

According to Soviet law, 2,422,000 out of an eligible adult voting population of 103,933,000 were disenfranchised for various reasons.

See also 
 1947 Estonian Supreme Soviet election

References
The Distinctiveness of Soviet Law. Ferdinand Joseph Maria Feldbrugge, ed. Martinus Nijhoff Publishers: Dordrecht (1987): 110.

1947 elections in the Soviet Union
Regional elections in the Soviet Union
February 1947 events in Asia 
February 1947 events in Europe